Giovanna Amati (born 20 July 1959) is an Italian former professional racing driver. She is the most recent female driver to have entered the Formula One World Championship.

Brought up in a wealthy background, Amati was kidnapped in 1978 before being released on an 800 million lira ransom.

She started her racing career in Formula Abarth series before moving up into Formula Three for 1985–86. An entry into Formula 3000 in 1987 brought little success but the following year, Amati improved her performances. She moved to Japan for 1989 but still had no success. A move back to Europe in 1990 saw better performances that continued into 1991. In 1992, Amati became the fifth woman Formula One driver when she signed for Brabham.

Early life
Amati was born in Rome on 20 July 1959, to actress Anna Maria Pancani and theatre-chain owner Giovanni Amati. As a child, she displayed a passion for cars and expressed the wish to attend a motor racing academy when older.

Kidnapping
At the age of 19, Amati was kidnapped for ransom on 12 February 1978 by three gangsters in a group led by Jean Daniel Nieto. Amati was forcibly removed from a car she was sitting in near her parents' villa in Rome and was taken away in a van. Her captors initially took her to a house near her parents' home, but moved her to a remote location after police called at the house. Amati was kept in a wooden cage for 75 days and was physically and mentally abused although Nieto occasionally comforted her. Amati was released on an 800 million-lira ($933,000 at the time) ransom on 27 April 1978 after two months of captivity. As the Italian authorities had introduced a policy of freezing the assets belonging to the families of kidnapped people in an attempt to fight organised crime by preventing ransom-payments, Amati's parents were able to pay the ransom by using box office receipts from the film Star Wars, selling family jewellery and borrowing money from their servants' life savings. 

Nieto, a French citizen, was later arrested after a meeting with Amati arranged by the police. When he was released, newspapers published stories detailing Amati's Stockholm syndrome and the strong emotional relationship between her and her captor. He was sentenced to 18 years in prison. Nieto escaped prison in 1989 and remained a fugitive until he was arrested again in April 2010.

Career

Early career
To improve her driving skills, Amati attended a motor racing school together with her friend, Elio de Angelis. She began racing professionally in the Formula Abarth series in 1981, winning several times over the next four years. In 1985–86 she moved up to Italian Formula Three, again running a successful campaign and scoring a few wins. In 1987 she graduated to Formula 3000. She entered three races, but only qualified once at Donington. Amati competed again in F3000 in 1988 with Lola and managed to secure two 10th places at Monza and Jerez. At Jerez, she finished behind future Formula One drivers Jean-Denis Délétraz, Jean Alesi and Marco Apicella. In 1989 Amati moved to Japan and competed for a brief period in the Super Formula Championship with little success. In 1990, she returned to Europe to the International F3000. Within the first four rounds, she raced with Roni Motorsports in a Reynard 90D Cosworth before moving to Lola for round five. Her final team change was to Cobra Motorsports for the five remaining races. In 1990, Amati was involved in a crash with British driver Phil Andrews, when they collided during a test session prior to the Brands Hatch race that year. They both reported minor injuries. 

In 1991, Amati joined GJ Motorsports driving a Reynard 91D Cosworth for the entire season. She qualified for six rounds and managed to draw a few top-ten finishes although she never scored any points. By the end of the year, Amati tested a Formula One car for the first time, completing 30 laps on a Benetton.

Formula One
Amati signed with the Brabham team in January 1992 to partner Eric van de Poele after the team was unable to sign Japanese F3000 driver Akihiko Nakaya, who was not granted a superlicence due to the FIA not recognising the Japanese F3000 series as a stepping stone in motor racing. Amati was the first female driver to enter a Formula One race since Desiré Wilson in 1980 and the announcement earned a great degree of publicity for the then struggling Brabham team. During the first round in South Africa, mechanics were still busy assembling her car.

In South Africa, Amati's inexperience showed on the track. She spun six times during practice and was unable to qualify after setting a time that was nine seconds slower than pole sitter Nigel Mansell and four seconds slower than teammate van de Poele.

At the Mexican Grand Prix, Amati failed to qualify again, setting a time more than 10 seconds slower than Mansell.

Amati's last attempt to qualify a Formula One car was in Brazil. She and van de Poele lapped respectively 10 and 6 seconds slower than Mansell, and were excluded from the race. Brabham sacked Amati and replaced her with future 1996 World Champion Damon Hill. Hill failed to qualify for the next five races until he successfully put the car on the grid for the 1992 British Grand Prix, although he lapped over eight seconds slower than pole sitter Mansell. As of 2022, Amati is the last female driver who has attempted to qualify a Formula One car.

Post-Formula One career
Amati went into the Porsche SuperCup for 1993 to win the Women's European Championship. From 1994 to 1996, she raced in the Ferrari Challenge. She took a sabbatical in 1997 before returning in 1998 with a Ferrari 355. She also raced in the International Sports Racing Series driving an Alfa Romeo Giudici Gaiero SPN. Amati competed in the 1998 Sebring 12 Hours in a BMW M3, driving alongside Craig Carter and Andy Petery but retired due to clutch trouble. She also entered the 1000 km of Monza alongside Loic Depailler, Marco Lucchinelli, and Xavier Pompidou but they were unable to start. Amati then finished 11th at Le Mans during a two-hour race alongside Guido Knycz and Giovanni Gulinelli. In 1999, Amati raced in the SportsRacing World Cup driving a Tampolli RS2-RTA99 for the Cauduro Tampolli team alongside Angelo Lancelotti in the SR2 class. She finished third in the SR2 class at the end of the year. 

Following her retirement from motor sport, Amati worked briefly as a sport commentator, writing columns for Italian motorsport publications and providing television commentary.

Racing record

Complete International Formula 3000 results
(key) (Races in bold indicate pole position) (Races in italics indicate fastest lap)

Complete Formula One results
(key)

See also
List of female Formula One drivers

References

External links
 Giovanna Amati Biography at F1 Rejects
 Giovanna Amati Profile at ESPN
 Career Statistics
 Profile at Driver Database

1959 births
Living people
Kidnapped Italian people
Italian racing drivers
Italian Formula One drivers
Italian female racing drivers
Italian Formula Three Championship drivers
International Formula 3000 drivers
British Formula 3000 Championship drivers
Porsche Supercup drivers
Brabham Formula One drivers
FIA European Formula 3 Championship drivers
Racing drivers from Rome